Eboue, Eboué, or Éboué may refer to:

Eboué, Ivory Coast, village in Comoé District, Ivory Coast
Emmanuel Eboué (born 1983), Ivorian footballer
Félix Éboué (1884–1944), French administrator